The Luxor Temple is a large Ancient Egyptian temple complex located on the east bank of the Nile River in the city today known as Luxor (ancient Thebes) and was constructed approximately 1400 BCE. In the Egyptian language it was known as ipet resyt, "the southern sanctuary". It was one of the two primary temples on the east bank, the other being Karnak. Unlike the other temples in Thebes, Luxor temple is not dedicated to a cult god or a deified version of the pharaoh in death.  Instead, Luxor temple is dedicated to the rejuvenation of kingship; it may have been where many of the pharaohs of Egypt were crowned in reality or conceptually (as in the case of Alexander the Great, who claimed he was crowned at Luxor but may never have traveled south of Memphis, near modern Cairo).

To the rear of the temple are chapels built by Amenhotep III of the 18th Dynasty, and Alexander. Other parts of the temple were built by Tutankhamun and Ramesses II. During the Roman era, the temple and its surroundings were a legionary fortress and the home of the Roman government in the area. During the Roman period a chapel inside the Luxor Temple originally dedicated to the goddess Mut was transformed into a Tetrarchy cult chapel and later into a church.

Along with the other archeological sites in Thebes, the Luxor Temple was inscribed on the UNESCO World Heritage List in 1979.

Construction

The Luxor Temple was built with sandstone from the Gebel el-Silsila area, which is  located in South-Western Egypt. This sandstone is referred to as Nubian sandstone. It was used for the construction for monuments in Upper Egypt as well as in the course of past and current restoration works.

Like other Egyptian structures, a common technique used was symbolism, or illusionism. For example, to the Egyptian, a sanctuary shaped like an Anubis jackal was really Anubis. At the Luxor Temple, the two obelisks (the smaller one closer to the west is now at the Place de la Concorde in Paris) flanking the entrance were not the same height, but they created the illusion that they were. With the layout of the temple they appear to be of equal height, but using illusionism, it enhances the relative distances hence making them look the same size to the wall behind it. Symbolically, it is a visual and spatial effect to emphasize the heights and distance from the wall, enhancing the already existing pathway.

Excavation
From the Middle Ages, the Muslim population of Luxor had settled in and around the temple, at the southward end of the mount. The Luxor Temple had begun to be excavated by Professor Gaston Maspero after 1884, after he had been given permission to commence operations. The excavations were carried out sporadically until 1960. Over time, accumulated rubbish of the ages had buried three quarters of the temple which contained the courts and colonnades which formed the nucleus of the Arab half of the modern village. Maspero had taken an interest earlier, and he had taken over the post of Mariette Pasha to complete the job in 1881. Not only was there rubbish, but there were also barracks, stores, houses, huts, pigeon towers, which needed to be removed in order to excavate the site. (There still exists a working mosque within the temple which was never removed.) Maspero received from the Egyptian minister of public works the authorization needed to obtain funds in order to negotiate compensation for the pieces of land covered by the houses and dependencies.

Festivals

The Luxor Temple was built during the New Kingdom and dedicated to the Theban Triad consisted of Amun, his consort Mut, and their son Khonsu. The focus of the annual Opet Festival, in which a cult statue of Amun was paraded down the Nile from nearby Karnak Temple (ipet-sut) to stay there for a while with his consort Mut, was to promote the fertility of Amun-Re and the Pharaoh. However, other studies at the temple by the Epigraphic Survey team present a completely new interpretation of Luxor and its great annual festival (the Feast of Opet). They have concluded that Luxor is the temple dedicated to the divine Egyptian ruler or, more precisely, to the cult of the Royal Ka. Examples of the cult of the Royal Ka can be seen with the colossal seated figures of the deified Ramesses II before the Pylon and at the entrance to the Grand colonnade are clearly Ka-statues, cult statues of the king as embodiment of the royal Ka.

Avenue of Sphinxes and Shrine stations

Six barque shrines, serving as way stations for the barques of the gods during festival processions, were set up on the avenue between the Karnak and Luxor Temple. Along the avenue the stations were set up for ceremonies such as the Feast of Opet which held significance to temple. Each station had a purpose, for example the fourth station was the station of Kamare, which cooled the oar of Amun. The Fifth station of Kamare was the station which received the beauty of Amun. Lastly the Sixth Station of Kamare was a shrine for Amun, Holy of Steps. 

A small mudbrick shrine was built in the courtyard of Nectanebo I in early second century (126 CE) and was dedicated to Serapis and Isis; it was presented to Roman Emperor Hadrian on his birthday.

Abu Haggag Mosque

The active Abu Haggag Mosque is located within the temple, standing on the ancient columns themselves. That part of the Luxor Temple was converted to a church by the Romans in 395 AD, and then to a mosque in 640, which is more than 3,400 years of continuous religious worship.

Defacement

In 2013, a Chinese student posted a picture of engraved graffiti that read "Ding Jinhao was here" in Chinese on a sculpture. This discovery spurred debate about increased tourism after the media confirmed a Chinese student caused this and other defacements. The engraving has since been partially cleared.

Gallery

See also
 Temple of Khonsu
 Luxor Museum

References

External links

Buildings and structures completed in the 14th century BC
1884 archaeological discoveries
Archaeological sites in Egypt
Egyptian temples
Colossal statues in Egypt
Former religious buildings and structures in Egypt
Thebes, Egypt
Buildings and structures in Luxor Governorate